Gli eroi del doppio gioco (Italian for "Heroes of the double play") is a 1962 Italian comedy film directed by Camillo Mastrocinque.

Plot 
The film tells the successful attempts of two families of cancelling the traces of their involvement with Fascism after the Second World War.

Cast 

Mario Carotenuto as Romolo Rossi
Aroldo Tieri as  Primo Rossi
Carlo Croccolo as Secondo Rossi
Gabriele Antonini as  Benito Rossi
Gianrico Tedeschi as  Pietro Malaguti
Wandisa Guida as  Luciana Riccio
Carlo D'Angelo as  Yerarch Riccio
Gino Bramieri as  Vincenzo Barbara

References

External links

1962 films
Italian comedy films
Italian satirical films
Italian political satire films
1962 comedy films
Commedia all'italiana
Films directed by Camillo Mastrocinque
Politics in fiction
Films set in the 1940s
Films about fascists
1960s Italian films